The 2012 Formula 3 Australian Drivers' Championship was a CAMS sanctioned national motor racing title with the winner awarded the 2012 CAMS Gold Star award. The 2012 championship was the 56th Australian Drivers' Championship and the eighth to be contested with open wheel racing cars constructed in accordance with FIA Formula 3 regulations. The 2012 Australian Formula 3 Championship title was also awarded to the series winner. The championship began on 1 March 2012 at the Adelaide Street Circuit and ended on 23 September at Phillip Island Grand Prix Circuit after seven rounds across six different states with three races at each round.

The championship was secured by British driver James Winslow after the penultimate round held at Queensland Raceway. It was Winslow's second championship victory after having won previously in 2008. Winslow, driving for R-Tek Motorsport, won 13 of the 21 races, including five of the seven feature races, over the course of the season, a new record for the Australian Drivers' Championship, eclipsing the 12 wins Rick Kelly took in 2001. Defending champion Chris Gilmour ended the series in second place having won two races. Winslow's teammate Steel Giuliania finished third in the championship with just over half of the points Winslow collected. Jordan Skinner of Team BRM and Hayden Cooper of BF Racing each collected a their debut race victories. The other races wins were collected by John Magro whose partial season campaign with Team BRM ended with winning the Hidden Valley round. Tim Macrow made a brief return to the series he won in 2007, contesting a single round with Astuti Motorsport, winning at Sydney Motorsport Park.

Cooper won the National Class, for cars built between 1999 and 2004, over fellow Queensland and BF Racing teammate Ben Gersekowski. Lochie Marshall finished third.

Race calendar

The championship was contested over a seven-round series, with two Sprint Races and a Feature Race at each round.

Teams and drivers

The following teams and drivers contested the 2012 Australian Drivers' Championship. Entries sourced in part from:

Classes
Competing cars were nominated into one of three classes:
 Australian Formula 3 Championship – for automobiles constructed in accordance with the FIA Formula 3 regulations that applied in the year of manufacture between 1 January 2002 and 31 December 2011.
 National Class – for automobiles constructed in accordance with the FIA Formula 3 regulations that applied in the year of manufacture between 1 January 1999 and 31 December 2004.
 Invitation Class.

There were no competitors in the Invitation Class in the 2012 championship.

Points system
Championship points were awarded as follows:
 One point to the driver placed in the highest grid position for the first race at each round.
 12–9–8–7–6–5–4–3–2–1 for the first ten finishing position in each Sprint Race.
 20–15–12–10–8–6–4–3–2–1 for the first ten finishing position in each Feature Race.
 One point to the driver setting the fastest lap time in each race.

Points towards the National Class award were allocated on the same basis as used for the outright championship.

Results

Drivers' championship

See also
 Australian Drivers' Championship
 Australian Formula 3

References

External links
 Official Australian Formula 3 website

Australian Drivers' Championship
Drivers' Championship
Australian Formula 3 seasons
Australia
Australian Formula 3